Growth differentiation factor 2 (GDF2) also known as bone morphogenetic protein (BMP)-9 is a protein that in humans is encoded by the GDF2 gene. GDF2 belongs to the transforming growth factor beta superfamily.

Structure 

GDF2 contains an N-terminal TGF-beta-like pro-peptide (prodomain) (residues 56–257) and a C-terminal transforming growth factor beta superfamily domain (325–428). GDF2 (BMP9) is secreted as a pro-complex consisting of the BMP9 growth factor dimer non-covalently bound to two BMP9 prodomain molecules in an open-armed conformation.

Function 

GDF2 has a role in inducing and maintaining the ability of embryonic basal forebrain cholinergic neurons (BFCN) to respond to a neurotransmitter called acetylcholine; BFCN are important for the processes of learning, memory and attention. GDF2 is also important for the maturation of BFCN. Another role of GDF2 has been recently suggested.  GDF2 is a potent inducer of hepcidin (a cationic peptide that has antimicrobial properties) in liver cells (hepatocytes) and can regulate iron metabolism.  The physiological receptor of GDF2 is activin receptor-like kinase 1, ALK1 (also called ACVRL1), an endothelial-specific type I receptor of the TGF-beta receptor family. Endoglin, a type I membrane glycoprotein that forms the TGF-beta receptor complex, is a co-receptor of ALK1 for GDF2/BMP-9 binding. Mutations in ALK1 and endoglin cause hereditary hemorrhagic telangiectasia (HHT), a rare but life-threatening genetic disorder that leads to abnormal blood vessel formation in multiple tissues and organs of the body.

GDF2 is one of the most potent BMPs to induce orthotopic bone formation in vivo.  BMP3, a blocker of most BMPs seems not to affect GDF2.

GDF2 induces the differentiation of mesenchymal stem cells (MSCs) to an osteoblast lineage. The Smad signaling pathway of GDF2 target HEY1 inducing the differentiation by up regulating it. Augmented expression of HEY1 increase the mineralization of the cells. RUNX2 is another factor who's up regulate by GDF2. This factor is known to be essential for osteoblastic differentiation.

Interactions 

The signaling complex for bone morphogenetic proteins (BMP) start with a ligand binding with a high affinity type I receptor (ALK1-7) followed by the recruitment of a type II receptor(ActRIIA, ActRIIB, BMPRII). The first receptor kinase domain is then trans-phosphorylated by the apposed, activating type II receptor kinase domain. GDF2 binds ALK1 and ActRIIB with the highest affinity in the BMPs, it also binds, with a lower affinity ALK2, also known has Activin A receptor, type I (ACVR1), and the other type II receptors BMPRII and ActRIIA. GDF2 and BMP10 are the only ligands from the TGF-β superfamily that can bind to both type I and II receptors with equally high affinity. This non-discriminative formation of the signaling complex open the possibility of a new mechanism. In cell type with low expression level of ActRIIB, GDF2 might still signal due to its affinity to ALK1, then form complex with type II receptors.

Associate Disease

Mutations in GDF2 have been identified in patients with a vascular disorder phenotypically overlapping with hereditary hemorrhagic telangiectasia.

Signaling

Like other BMPs, GDF2 binding to its receptors triggers the phosphorylation of the R-Smads, Smad1,5,8. The activation of this pathway has been documented in all cellular types analyzed up to date, including hepatocytes and HCC cells. GDF2 also triggers Smad-2/Smad-3 phosphorylation in different endothelial cell types.

Another pathway for GDF2 is the induced non-canonical one. Little is known about this type of pathway in GDF2. GDF2 activate JNK in osteogenic differentiation of mesenchymal progenitor cells (MPCs). GDF2 also triggers p38 and ERK activation who will modulate de Smad pathway, p38 increase the phosphorylation of Smad 1,5,8 by GDF2 whereas ERK has the opposite effect.

The transcriptional factor p38 activation induced by GDF2 has been documented in other cell types such as osteosarcoma cells, human osteoclasts derived from cord blood monocytes, and dental follicle stem cells.

References

Further reading 

 
 
 
 
 
 
 
 
 
 
 
 
 
 

Developmental genes and proteins
TGFβ domain